Bang Rak is a tambon (subdistrict) of Mueang Trang District, Trang Province.

History
Bang Rak is part of Mueang Trang District otherwise known as downtown Trang. It is classified as one of the oldest populated places of Trang. It is a quay since ancient times where the Chinese settled and lived on the banks of the Trang River. Hence, the Trang River has another name "Tha Chin River" (แม่น้ำท่าจีน, ; "Chinese port river"). Therefore, Bang Rak area is known as "Tha Chin" as well.

Geography
Its terrain is a lowland area with the Trang River or locally known as Tha Chin River flowing through it. The subdistrict is bounded by other subdistricts (from the north clockwise): Nong Trut and Na Ta Luang with Khok Lo as well as Khuan Pring in its district, Khuan Thani in Kantang District, and Na To Ming in its district again.

There is an island in the middle of the Trang River that looks like a map of Thailand in the Nong Pluak Public Space. It is an artificial island completed  on April 30, 1990.

Administration
Bang Rak is governed by the  Subdistrict Administrative Organization Bang Rak (SAO Bang Rak).

The area also consists of six administrative muban (village)

The emblem of the Subdistrict Administrative Organization shows a Chinese junk sailing on the Trang River.

Population
As of May 2008, it had a total population of 3,982 (1,950 men, 2,032 women) in 1,510 households.

Places
Wat Prasitthichai (Wat Tha Chin)
Saparachinee 2 School

Notes

External links
 

Tambon of Trang Province